Samhita Vinya is an Indian actress who predominantly appears in Kannada films.

Early life and Career
Samhita Vinya was born in Sakleshpur town of Karnataka state. Later she moved to Bangalore. In 2014, Samhita was crowned as Miss Karnataka and Miss Glamour Diva in the year 2015.

Samhita Vinya made her acting debut with the Kannada film Haalu Thuppa in 2017, where she played a social activist village girl role. In 2018, She got her second film released Amrutha Ghalige and played a role of an infertility women. In 2019 Samhita Vinya worked as a lead role in Kannada film "Vishnu Circle". 

In 2020, she played a role of a widow in Seethamma Bandalu Sirimallige Thottu.

Filmography

Short Movies

References

External links
 

Actresses in Kannada cinema
Kannada people
Actresses in Telugu cinema
Living people
Indian film actresses
Actresses from Karnataka
Year of birth missing (living people)